Rizvi or Rizavi or رضوی is the Urdu form of the Arabic surname Radawi/Radhawi and the Persian surname Razavi. It is a surname commonly associated with Muslims, who claim descent from the Imam Ali al-Ridha, a descendant of the Islamic prophet Muhammad through his grandson Husayn ibn Ali. Since the Rizvi clan trace their lineage to Fatimah, many of them often use the prefix Sayyid (or its synonyms) in front of their name.

Notable people with the surname Rizvi
 Abbas Rizvi is a Pakistani author and Urdu poet.
 Abis Rizvi is an Indian film producer and businessman.
 Adeebul Hasan Rizvi is head of Sindh Institute of Urology and Transplantation (SIUT).
 Akhtar Hussein Rizvi was a noted Indian lyricist and poet under the pen name "Kaifi Azmi".
 Ali Amjad Rizvi is a Pakistani-born Canadian atheist, secular humanist and activist.
 Ali Hussain Rizvi is a former Pakistani cricketer.
 Anusha Rizvi is a Bollywood director, famous for her debut movie, Peepli Live.
 Asif Iqbal Rizvi is a former Pakistani cricketer.
Gowher Rizvi is a Bangladeshi historian, scholar, and academic who currently serves as the international affairs advisor to Prime Minister Sheikh Hasina.
 Haidar Abbas Rizvi is the deputy parliamentary leader of Muttahida Qaumi Movement in the National Parliament of Pakistan.
 Syed Hasan Rizvi was a Pakistani Urdu poet under the pen name Shakeb Jalali.
 Shah Ïnayatullah Rizvi was a 17th-century revolutionary poet from Miranpur, Sindh, Pakistan.
 Jalaluddin Rizvi is a former field hockey player who represented India.
 Khawar Rizvi was a prominent poet in Urdu and Persian.
 Khurshid Rizvi is a Pakistani scholar, poet, linguist and historian of Arabic languages and literature.
 Komal Rizvi is a Pakistani singer and TV host.
 Majida Rizvi is the first woman judge of a High Court in Pakistan.
 Nasreen Rizvi, known as Kaveeta, is a Pakistani film actress.
 Naushad Ali Rizvi is a former Pakistani cricketer.
 Parveen Rizvi, known as Sangeeta, is a Pakistani film actress, director and producer.
 Qasim Razvi was the leader of a local militia, the Razakars of Hyderabad, India.
 Runa Rizvi is an Indian singer.
 Saad Hussain Rizvi is an Islamic cleric and politician.
 Saeed Rizvi is a Pakistani film director, producer, and writer.
 Ayatollah Sa'id Akhtar Rizvi was an Indian advocate of Islam in East Africa.
 Sonya Rizvi, known as Sonya Jehan, is a Pakistani actress
 Suhail Rizvi is an Indian-American co-founder and Chief Investment Officer of Rizvi Traverse Management.
 Ayatollah Syed Ahmed Rizvi Kashmiri was a Shia Mujtahid who lived in Kashmir and died on 9 July 1964.
 Allamah Syed Ali Akhtar Rizvi was an Indian Twelver Shī'ah scholar, public speaker, author, historian and poet.
 Syed Ali Nawaz Shah Rizvi is a Pakistani politician.
 Syed Ali Qutab Shah Rizvi was a member of the Pakistani Sindh Provincial Assembly.
 Syed Meesaq Rizvi was a Pakistan sprinter and middle-distance runner.
 Syed Shaukat Hussain Rizvi was a pioneer of the Pakistani film industry.
 Syed Waseem Rizvi is the former name of Jitendra Narayan Singh Tyagi. He is a former chairman of the Shia Central Board of Waqf in Uttar Pradesh who converted to Hinduism. He filed a petition in India's Supreme Court to remove 26 verses from the Quran.                   
 Syed Zaheer Rizvi is a Pakistani music director and teacher.
 Uzma Z. Rizvi is an archaeologist and anthropologist whose work focuses on urbanization and  decolonizing practice.
 Zameer Rizvi is a Canadian singer and musician
 Ziauddin Rizvi was a Shi'a cleric born at Aumphary, Gilgit.

Arabic-language surnames
Islamic culture
Surnames
Hashemite people
Pakistani people of Arab descent
Muslim communities of India